Guadalupe Castañeda (born 24 February 1965 in Fresnillo, Mexico) is a Mexican former footballer who played for various clubs in Mexico.

Club career
A defender capable of lining up on either flank, Castañeda played eight years with Cruz Azul and later represented Chivas de Guadalajara. Nicknamed Lupillo, he began his career with Atlas in 1986–87 and moved to León in 1990, winning a starting fullback spot as León won the tournament championship title in the 1991–92 season. In 1993 Castañeda joined Cruz Azul, beginning a spell of club success that lasted until the end of 2000: Invierno 1997 title and CONCACAF Champions' Cup titles (1996 and 1997). He was transferred to Chivas in 2001, playing two and a half years at the Guadalajara club, then moved into the México Segunda División (Second Division) club Dorados de Sinaloa. The club was promoted and he ended his career in the Primera División (First or top League Division) at the Clausura 2006 campaign at the age of 41.

Castañeda scored only 5 goals in 479 recorded top-flight matches. The most significant of these was a last-minute goal for Cruz Azul against UNAM in the quarterfinal round of the 1994–95 playoffs, converting the rebound after Pumas goalkeeper Jorge Campos had saved a penalty. The goal secured Cruz Azul's place in the semifinals.

International career
Castañeda also earned seven caps for the Selección de fútbol de México (Mexico national team). His first international match was a 3–0 victory against Canada national team on 14 March 1991. He was recalled to the squad by coach Miguel Mejía Baron in 1993 and made several additional appearances, but was unable to dislodge incumbent Ramón Ramírez from the left fullback position. Castañeda's last cap came in a 0–0 draw against defending FIFA World Cup champion Die deutsche Fußballnationalmannschaft (Germany national team) on 22 December 1993.

Personal life
Castañeda's brother, Jorge, was also a professional footballer.

Honours
León
Mexican Primera División: 1991–92

Cruz Azul
Mexican Primera División: Invierno 1997
Copa México: 1996–97
CONCACAF Champions' Cup: 1996, 1997

Sinaloa
Primera División A: Apertura 2003

References

External links
 
 
 
 

1965 births
Living people
People from Fresnillo
Footballers from Zacatecas
Association football defenders
Mexican footballers
Mexico international footballers
Atlas F.C. footballers
Club León footballers
Cruz Azul footballers
C.D. Guadalajara footballers
Dorados de Sinaloa footballers